Clermont is a city in Lake County in central Florida, United States, about  west of Orlando and  southeast of Leesburg. The population was 43,021 in 2020. The city is residential in character and its economy is centered in retail trade, lodging, and tourism-oriented restaurants and bars. It is part of the Orlando–Kissimmee–Sanford Metropolitan Statistical Area.

Clermont is home to the 1956 Florida Citrus Tower, one of Florida's early landmarks.

History 
Clermont was founded in 1884 and named for the French birthplace of A.F. Wrotnowski, manager of the Clermont Improvement Company, formed for land development. The city was incorporated in 1916. Much of the county initially was developed as orange and other citrus groves, which was the basis of the economy through the mid-20th century. For instance, Apshawa Groves owned and worked large expanses of land in the county. It later became a major real estate company. Tourism also became increasingly important.

The appearance of the historic downtown district has not changed much since 1962.

The population grew 207% from 2000 to 2010, with commensurate economic growth, attracting big box retail stores. In Spring 2010, the Clermont Landings shopping center opened, featuring 20 shops and restaurants and the city's first cinema. Increased pollution from runoff and residential development has hurt the city's lakes and other natural resources.

Geography 

The Clermont area lies on the northern part of the Lake Wales Ridge. There are rolling hills atypical of the Florida peninsula. Nearby are the Clermont Chain of lakes and Lake Apopka.

Climate

According to the Köppen climate classification, Clermont has a humid subtropical climate (Cfa).

Demographics

As of the census of 2010, there were 28,742 people living in the city in 11,216 households. The population density in 2000 was 812/mi2 (314/km). There were 12,730 housing units. In 2000 the average density of Clermont 380/mi2 (147/km). The racial makeup of the city was 78.5% White, 11.2% African American, 0.42% Native American, 4.4% Asian, 5.37% from other races, and 3.83% from two or more races. Hispanic or Latino of any race were 22.1% of the population.

21.28% of households had children under the age of 18 living with them, 55.1% were married couples living together, 10.3% had a female householder with no husband present, and 31.5% were non-families. 26.3% of all households were made up of individuals, and 12.5% had someone living alone who was 65 years of age or older. The average household size was 2.29 and the average family size was 2.73.

In the city, the population was distributed with 20.1% under the age of 18, 6.3% from 18 to 24, 24.0% from 25 to 44, 24.7% from 45 to 64, and 24.8% who were 65 years of age or older. The median age was 45 years. For every 100 females, there were 89.9 males. For every 100 females age 18 and over, there were 85.5 males.

The median income for a household in the city was $39,290, and the median income for a family was $48,216. Males had a median income of $36,240 versus $26,571 for females. The per capita income for the city was $21,099. About 6.3% of families and 7.8% of the population were below the poverty line, including 15.0% of those under age 18 and 4.5% of those age 65 or over.

The income per capita is $24,952, which includes all adults and children. The median household income is $45,980.

The median home value in town is $227,510. Home appreciation was –21.40% during 2009. Renters made up 23.21% of the population. 8.33% of houses and apartments were unoccupied (vacancy rate).

Education 
Local schools include Minneola Elementary School, South Lake Charter Elementary (also known as Imagine Schools at South Lake), Cypress Ridge Elementary School, Lost Lake Elementary, Clermont Elementary School, Clermont Middle School, Windy Hill Middle School, East Ridge Middle School, Lake Minneola High School, East Ridge High School, South Lake High School, Sawgrass Bay Elementary, Pine Ridge Elementary, Real life Christian Academy, Grassy Lake Elementary and Pinecrest Lakes Academy.

Lake-Sumter State College and the University of Central Florida have a joint-use campus in Clermont.

A salesman wondered into town in 1904 and spoke promises of donating books to start a library if the town helped him sell his Chautauqua lectures to the folks. Many town members with money to spare put forth what they could, excited at the prospective to having a library open. However, come time for the lectures and only a few of the speakers showed- no salesman or books present. Not all money was handed over; the cost for the last lecture was still available, and with that amount they began to organize their own library. This was hosted in the Montrose Street home of Mrs. Payson Pierce, with the collection of books open to the town on Saturday afternoons. The Clermont Library Club also hosted their meetings at Mrs. Pierce's house with her permission. The books were moved to Isiah Benson's Lake Avenue house in 1910 and to the Baptist Church the following year due to the increase in library items but lack of shelving space.

Prior to this, residents paid 50 cents a year for their patronage which helped pay the dues to those that hosted the library. In the summer of 1914, the Friends of the Library fundraised for $600 to erect a one-room building on 630 DeSoto Street, a lot donated by Alice Cooper. The library was funded by the club and its small circulating collection staffed by Clermont Women's Club volunteers until the city took over in the 1950s and the Cooper Memorial Library Association was formed to administer the public library.  In 1980, a former bank building was purchased, and to transfer the books from one location to another, a human chain of town volunteers was made between both locations. The books were passed "hand by hand via a people chain" across the empty lots to their new home. Mike Delaney, a Friends of the Library member, reflected on this event: "It was an amazing honor to be part of the early book brigade when I was seven ... it was an experience that I will never forget that brought the community together". In 1984, the building was expanded by more than 4,000 square feet, adding the Florida Room and Children's Room. In 1982, the Cooper Memorial Library joined the Lake County Library System, and is the only continuous member of that system. The Cooper Memorial Library in Clermont is staffed by the Lake-Sumter State College and the Lake County Library System.

Places 
Downtown Clermont has restaurants, shops, the local Art League, Clermont City Center, and City Hall. The downtown's western area, known as Historic Village, includes sites such as the Townsend House, home to James and Sallie Townsend, the first African-American couple in Clermont. The building known as "Little Cooper" was moved to the Clermont Historic Village in 2009 and restored to be opened as a museum of local and world history. The Historic Village is maintained by the South Lake County Historical Society and the City of Clermont.

South Lake Hospital is the regional hospital of south Lake County.

The United States Triathlon National Training Center is located in Clermont. Duathlons, Triathlons and cross country races are held at the facility.

Waterfront Park is located along Lake Minneola, The park includes picnic areas, a swimming area, fishing piers and a playground. There are rentals of paddleboards, kayaks and bicycles. A fitness trail that is part of a 30-mile system runs through the park.

Notable people

 Edmond Amateis, sculptor and educator
 Dale Barnstable, retired professional basketball player
 Jason Couch, professional bowler, member of the PBA Hall of Fame
 Kate DiCamillo, author of children's books
 Julie Doe, an unidentified murder victim discovered in Clermont on September 25, 1988
 Norm Duke, professional bowler on the PBA Tour, PBA Hall of Famer
 Ryan Dungey, professional motocross racer
 Tyson Gay, sprinter
 Shane Greene, professional baseball player
 Peter Hooten, actor
 Brandon Larracuente, actor
 Marvin Musquin (born December 30, 1989, in La Reole, France), professional motocross racer
 Randy Pedersen, professional bowler on the PBA Tour, PBA Hall of Famer and bowling announcer
 Cassidy Rae, actor

Transportation
The main roads through Clermont consist of State Road 50 and U.S. Route 27.

Notes

External links 

 
 http://www.cityofclermontfl.com

 
Greater Orlando
Cities in Lake County, Florida
Populated places established in 1884
Cities in Florida
1884 establishments in Florida